Kiwa (real name Jaanus Kivaste; born in 1975) is an Estonian painter, composer, curator and writer.

He has studied sculpture at Estonian Art Academy, and philosophy at Tartu University.

He has practising experimental and interdisciplinary art, intertwining the action art, text, sound, visual and organisatorial activity.

Publications

 Teekond punktist "mittemidagi" punkti "eikuhugi". Postimees, 3 July 1997, p 19
 Imedemaal ja agulis. Sirp, 13 October 2000
 Soome noorkunstnik heiastab oma maailma. Tartu Postimees, 11 February 2003, p 2
 Rael Artel Gallery: Non-Profit Project Space : short tale of an experimental project's space tactics. Estonian Art, 2009, nr 2, pp 4–7

References

Living people
1975 births
Estonian painters